Murder Is My Beat is a 1955 film noir mystery film directed by Edgar G. Ulmer starring Paul Langton, Barbara Payton and Robert Shayne.

Plot
Businessman Frank Deane is found dead with his face and hands burned beyond recognition. Detective Patrick (Langton) pursues and arrests Deane's girlfriend, nightclub-singer Eden Lane (Payton). She makes little effort to deny her involvement in the death and is convicted of the crime. On the way to prison, accompanied by Patrick, Eden sees a man through the train window whom she identifies as the murdered man. Patrick, who has developed a romantic interest in the woman, believes her; he and Eden jump from the train to search for the man. They agree to allow themselves one week to solve this mystery or Eden will submit to her prison sentence. The situation has, naturally, put Patrick in legal jeopardy as well and he is eventually tracked down by his friend and superior, Detective Rawley (Shayne). Eden, in the meantime, convinced that the truth cannot be unveiled, furtively leaves Patrick and turns herself in. Rawley allows himself and Patrick twenty-four hours to try to bring together information and clues Patrick has turned up.

Cast
 Paul Langton as Ray Patrick
 Barbara Payton as Eden Lane
 Robert Shayne as Det. Bert Rawley
 Selena Royle as Beatrice Abbott
 Roy Gordon as Mr. Abbott
 Tracy Roberts as Patsy Flint 
 Kate MacKenna as Miss Farre
 Henry W. Harvey Sr. as the gas station attendant
 Jay Adler as Louie, the bartender

See also
List of American films of 1955

References

External links
 
 
 
 

1955 films
1955 crime drama films
American crime drama films
American black-and-white films
Film noir
Allied Artists films
Films directed by Edgar G. Ulmer
Films scored by Albert Glasser
Films produced by Aubrey Wisberg
Films with screenplays by Aubrey Wisberg
1950s English-language films
1950s American films